Strike the Blood is an anime series adapted from the light novel series of the same title written by Gakuto Mikumo with illustrations by Manyako. The fourth OVA series, projected at 12 episodes, debuted on April 8, 2020, and concluded on June 30, 2021. The opening theme is "Akatsuki no Kaleido Blood" by Kishida Kyōdan & The Akeboshi Rockets while the ending theme is "Dear My Hero" by Taneda. The staff from the third OVA series returned to reprise their roles. On May 15, 2020, it was announced that volume 2 was pushed back from June 24 to July 29 due to the COVID-19 pandemic.


Episode list

References

Strike the Blood episode lists
2020 Japanese television seasons
2021 Japanese television seasons
Anime postponed due to the COVID-19 pandemic